Andrew Swire Billig (born May 1, 1968) is an American politician of the Democratic Party and co-owner of the Spokane Indians minor league baseball team. On November 6, 2012, Billig was elected to the Washington State Senate, representing the 3rd Legislative District. He currently serves as the Senate Majority Leader.

Personal life

Billig grew up in Chevy Chase, Maryland. He is of Jewish descent. Billig graduated cum laude from Georgetown University in 1990 with a degree in government. He has two children, Isabella "Bella" and Samuel, and is an active runner and triathlete, having completed the Coeur d’Alene Ironman Triathlon in 2004.

Political positions

Billig has supported bills that would improve primary education, including a bill that would lower the compulsory education age in Washington from 8 to 5. He has also been active in expanding statewide voter access and campaign finance reform in addition to efforts to protect the Spokane River. In 2011, Billig received the Inter-Continental Smackdown Champion Award from Fuse Washington for his work against phosphorus pollution in Washington's lakes and rivers. He has also expressed support for gun control, including a bill that would ban possession of high-capacity magazines.

Washington House of Representatives

After he was elected to the House of Representatives in 2010, Billig immediately assumed a transportation leadership position in the House, serving as vice-chair of the House Transportation Committee. In that role, he helped write the state's two-year transportation budget. Billig also served on the Education, Environment, and Technology & Economic Development committees.

Washington Senate

In 2012, Billig was elected to the Senate, where he was given a position of leadership as the Minority Whip. In 2015 he was chosen to represent the caucus as the Deputy Leader, and now serves as the Senate Majority Leader. During the 2018 legislative session, he served on the Early Learning & K-2 Education, Ways & Means, and Rules committees. One of his primary achievements of the 2018 session was the DISCLOSE Act, which increases transparency of campaign contributions and closes campaign finance disclosure loopholes.

Spokane Indians Baseball Team

In 1992, Billig became general manager of the Spokane Indians Baseball Team. He later became president and co-owner of the team and remains active in management and ownership.

Awards

Billig has been recognized repeatedly for his leadership with the Spokane Indians, being voted Northwest League Executive of the Year in both 1994 and 2004. He was also nominated for the Larry MacPhail Award for promotional excellence several times and won the Joe Martin Award for Service to Baseball and the Community in 2007.

References

External links
Senate homepage
Campaign website

1968 births
21st-century American politicians
Bethesda-Chevy Chase High School alumni
Living people
Democratic Party members of the Washington House of Representatives
People from Chevy Chase, Maryland
Democratic Party Washington (state) state senators